Clifford Obrecht (born 1985/1986) is an Australian billionaire technology entrepreneur, who is the co-founder (with Melanie Perkins) and chief operating officer (COO) of Canva.

He is the son of Stan, who worked in government and Mary Obrecht a schoolteacher. He grew up in Kingsley, a suburb to the north of Perth, Western Australia. He has a younger brother.

Obrecht earned a degree from the University of Western Australia.

Obrecht owns 18% of Canva. As of September 2022, his net worth was estimated at US$6.5 billion.

In January 2021, he married Melanie Perkins on Rottnest Island. They live in Surry Hills, Sydney, with their pet dog.

References

Living people
Australian billionaires
Australian company founders
Technology company founders
People from Perth, Western Australia
Year of birth missing (living people)